Darrell Bailey (born ), better known as Clipper Darrell, is a superfan of the Los Angeles Clippers of the National Basketball Association. A season ticket holder since the 2000–01 season, he dances, leads cheers, and taunts the opposing team at home games in a half red, half blue suit—the Clippers' team colors. One of his usual chants is "Let's go Clippers!". A personal favorite of his is "U-G-L-Y, you ain’t got no alibi, you ugly!", which he directs at opposing players when they shoot free throws. He is one of the few remaining clean hecklers in the NBA.

Bailey drives a 1995 BMW 740i, customized in the Clippers' red, white, and blue color scheme. The hood features a Clippers logo and autographs, and the license plates are customized with CLIPERD. His home in Los Angeles is painted in the team's colors with a red, white and blue basketball court in the driveway and a Clippers logo on the pavement. The front door is red, and the living room is white and blue with Clippers logos prominent from the walls to the floor tiles.

As a student growing up in South Los Angeles, Bailey was known as a jokester. He held various jobs after dropping out of community college. In 1984, he was fired from his job and told by his boss that he would "never amount to anything". After hearing an announcer say the same about the Clippers, he decided to support the team. He was originally known as Dancing Man before changing to Clipper Darrell after a few radio appearances. He attended 386 consecutive games until the streak was broken by a trip to the hospital for high blood pressure. The New York Times called him "the team’s unofficial biggest fan". The Wall Street Journal wrote, "He’s perhaps the only superfan in the history of the Los Angeles Clippers." He is not an employee of the Clippers organization. In February 2012, there was a dispute with the team over the use of Clipper in his name. The Clippers accused him of capitalizing on the Clipper name, but later reached a mutual agreement that Bailey would notify the Clippers when appearing publicly as Clipper Darrell.

In 2014, former Clippers co-owner Shelly Sterling received the title of "Clippers Number One Fan” as part of the sales agreement with incoming owner Steve Ballmer. Yahoo! Sports, however, opined that Clipper Darrell was "the Clippers No. 1 fan, no matter what official documents say."

On December 12, 2022, Darrell was involved in a physical altercation at a Clippers game. Darrell was knocked unconscious and was transported to a hospital.

Bailey has a wife and four children.

References

External links

Superfan: Clipper Darrell (video) at yahoo.com

Living people
Los Angeles Clippers
Sports spectators
Date of birth missing (living people)
People from Los Angeles
Year of birth missing (living people)